Dinwiddie may refer to:

 Ettleton, a village in the Scottish Borders
 Dinwiddie, Indiana, unincorporated community 
 Dinwiddie County, Virginia, a county in Virginia, United States
 Dinwiddie, Virginia, the county seat of Dinwiddie County
 Fort Dinwiddie (1755–1789), a fort for the Virginia Militia during the French and Indian War and Revolutionary War
 Dinwiddie (surname)

See also

 Dinwoodie (disambiguation)